Sir Thomas Hales, 3rd Baronet ( – October 1762), of Beakesbourne in Kent, was an English courtier and Whig politician who sat in the House of Commons for 37 years between 1722 and 1762.

Hales was the eldest son of Sir Thomas Hales, 2nd Baronet, of Brymore, and his wife Mary Pym, daughter of Sir Charles Pym, 1st Baronet of Brymore. He matriculated at Oriel College, Oxford in 1711 and was admitted at the Inner Temple. He succeeded his father as 3rd Baronet on 7 January 1748.

Hales entered Parliament at the 1722 British general election as Whig Member of Parliament for Minehead, being a member of the Duke of Dorset's faction and supporting the Walpole and Pelham governments. He subsequently also represented Camelford, Grampound, Hythe and East Grinstead, being an MP for most of the last forty years of his life.

The only break in his Parliamentary career came in 1741: at the notoriously corrupt rotten borough of Grampound, his opponents had contrived a disagreement over who was the rightful Mayor and therefore returning officer for the constituency. According to their Mayor, Hales and his pro-government colleague Thomas Trefusis were re-elected by 35 votes to 17; however, his opponents had arranged for the Sheriff to direct the writ for the election to their own nominee, so it was his version of the result (declaring Hales and Trefusis defeated by 27 to 23) which was returned to Parliament. Hales and Trefusis initially petitioned against this outcome, but withdrew their protest before a decision had been reached. Hales returned to the Commons at a by-election for Hythe three years later.

Hales held the lucrative post of Clerk of the Board of Green Cloth to the Prince of Wales from about 1719 until 1727, and to the King from his accession in 1727 until 1760. He was also Lieutenant of Dover Castle from 1728 to 1750 and Vice-Warden of the Cinque Ports from 1750 until his death. On the accession of George III in 1760 he lost his posts in the Royal Household, and successfully applied to Prime Minister Newcastle for a pension in recompense, although he was granted only £600 a year in place of the £800 he had asked for.

Hales died in 1762. He had married Mary Marsham (1698–1769), daughter of Sir Robert Marsham of the Mote, in 1723, and their children included:
 Sir Thomas Pym Hales (c. 1726–1773), who succeeded to the baronetcy
 Sir Philip Hales (died 1824)
 Mary Hales, who married Charles Moss (1711–1802), Bishop of Bath and Wells
 Anne Hales (1736–1795), who married (first) Lord Feversham (died 1763) and (second) The Earl of Radnor (1725–1776)
 Margaretta Hales, who married Samuel Pechell of Richmond

References

 Hales genealogy
Robert Beatson, A Chronological Register of Both Houses of Parliament (London: Longman, Hurst, Res & Orme, 1807) 
Henry Stooks Smith, "The Parliaments of England from 1715 to 1847" (2nd edition, edited by FWS Craig – Chichester: Parliamentary Reference Publications, 1973)

|-

1762 deaths
Alumni of Oriel College, Oxford
Members of the Inner Temple
Baronets in the Baronetage of England
Members of the Parliament of Great Britain for English constituencies
Whig (British political party) MPs
Year of birth uncertain
Members of the Parliament of Great Britain for constituencies in Cornwall
British MPs 1722–1727
British MPs 1727–1734
British MPs 1734–1741
British MPs 1741–1747
British MPs 1747–1754
British MPs 1754–1761
British MPs 1761–1768
People from Bekesbourne